Neil Jukes (born 23 May 1976) is a former professional rugby league footballer who played in the 1990s for Leigh and Rochdale Hornets. and the head coach of the Leigh Centurions. He had been assistant coach at Leigh between 2009 and 2016.

Jukes made his debut for Leigh in January 1995, and went on to make 32 appearances for the club. His playing career ended in 1998 after suffering an injury while playing for Rochdale Hornets.

References

External links
Leigh Centurions profile

1976 births
Living people
English rugby league coaches
English rugby league players
Leigh Leopards coaches
Leigh Leopards players
Rochdale Hornets players
Place of birth missing (living people)